FC Nanumaga or Ha'apai United is a Tuvalu football club from Nanumanga, playing in the Tuvalu A-Division.

The team's home ground is the Tuvalu Sports Ground, the only football field in Tuvalu. Nanumaga plays on an amateur level, as do all the teams in Tuvalu. They also have a reserve squad. Nanumaga has never won a title in Tuvalu.

Current squad
As of 5 July 2012.

Ha'apai United B

Honours

Cup
Tuvalu KnockOut Cup
Runners-up (1): 1998
Independence Cup
Runners-up (2): 2001, 2002
NBT Cup
Runners-up (2): 2008, 2016
Tuvalu Games
Runners-up (1): 2014

References

External links
 Official Dutch Support Tuvalu Website
 TNFA official website

Nanumanga
Football clubs in Tuvalu
Tuvalu A-Division
1980 establishments in Tuvalu
Association football clubs established in 1980